Kevin Lamar Johnson (born October 30, 1970) is a former American football defensive tackle who played three seasons in the National Football League with the Philadelphia Eagles and Oakland Raiders. He was drafted by the New England Patriots in the fourth round of the 1993 NFL Draft. He first enrolled at Los Angeles Harbor College before transferring to Texas Southern University. Johnson attended Westchester High School in Los Angeles, California. He was also a member of the Orlando Predators and Los Angeles Avengers of the Arena Football League.

References

External links
Just Sports Stats

Living people
1970 births
Players of American football from Los Angeles
American football defensive tackles
Los Angeles Harbor Seahawks football players
Texas Southern Tigers football players
Philadelphia Eagles players
Oakland Raiders players
Orlando Predators players
Los Angeles Avengers players
Westchester High School (Los Angeles) alumni